Club Voleibol Alcobendas also known as CV Alcobendas is a Spanish Women's Volleyball Club from Alcobendas in Madrid. Founded since the year of 2000, The Club currently plays in the Superliga Femenina de Voleibol.

History

Honours
Superliga Femenina 2
 Runners Up : 2012–13

Season to season

2015–16 Season Squad
Head coach :  Guillermo Falasca

References

External links
Alcobendas Voleibol Club Page 
Spanish Volleyball Federation 

Sports teams in the Community of Madrid
Spanish volleyball clubs
Volleyball clubs established in 2000
Sport in Alcobendas
2000 establishments in Spain